Piletosoma is a genus of moths of the family Crambidae.

Species
Piletosoma argoponalis 
Piletosoma caeruleonigra (Schaus, 1912)
Piletosoma chaquimayalis Schaus, 1924
Piletosoma guianalis Schaus, 1924
Piletosoma holophaealis Hampson, 1912
Piletosoma ignidorsalis Hampson, 1898 (from Peru)
Piletosoma novalis Walker, 1866
Piletosoma tacticalis Schaus, 1924
Piletosoma thialis

References

Natural History Museum Lepidoptera genus database

Pyraustinae
Crambidae genera
Taxa named by George Hampson